"Atofio Hrisafi" is a song by Greek singer Katy Garbi and Dionisis Shinas. It was released on digital platforms on 8 March 2021 by Panik Platinum, a sub-label of Panik Records, as the fifth single from Garbi's upcoming twenty-first studio album.

"Atofio Hrisafi" is a cover of the track written and produced by Phoebus contained on Garbi's 1994 album Atofio Hrisafi. The track was re-recorded as a duet between Garbi and Shinas and remixed by Kostas Lainas. The single reached number 1 on the 'Top 20 Greek Official IFPI Airplay Chart.

A lyric video containing images of Garbi and Shinas together was release on 17 March 2021.

Release history

Awards
"Atofio Hrisafi" was nominated for Single of the Year in 2021 at the Super Music Awards (Cyprus), resulting in no win.

Charts
"Atofio Hrisafi" debuted on the Cyprus Top 20 Combined Airplay Chart at number 20 upon its release, peaking at number 1 for three consecutive weeks and remaining in the Top 20 for 21 weeks. The single debuted on the Top 20 Greek Official IFPI Airplay Chart'' at number 16, peaking at number 1, remaining in the Top 20 for 26 weeks.

Weekly charts

Year-end charts

References

Katy Garbi songs
2021 songs
Songs written by Phoebus (songwriter)